Sucker's Portfolio, by Kurt Vonnegut, is a collection of six short stories, one non-fiction essay, and one unfinished short story written by Vonnegut and published posthumously by Amazon Publishing. The collection was initially released in early 2013 as serial episodes available on the Kindle e-reader. It was released as a complete book on March 12, 2013.

Contents
 Between Timid and Timbuktu
 Rome
 Eden by the River
 Sucker's Portfolio
 Miss Snow, You're Fired
 Paris, France
 The Last Tasmanian
 Robotville and Mr. Caslow

2013 short story collections
Books by Kurt Vonnegut
Books published posthumously